is a railway station on the Senseki Line in the city of Ishinomaki, Miyagi, Japan, operated by East Japan Railway Company (JR East).

Lines
Ishinomakiayumino Station is served by the Senseki Line (including the Senseki-Tōhoku Line).

Station layout
The station has one 85 m (four cars) long side platform serving a single bidirectional track. The station is unstaffed.

History
The station opened on 26 March 2016. Construction of the station cost approximately 482 million yen, and this was funded by the city of Ishinomaki together with grants from the national government.

Passenger statistics
The station is expected to be used by an average of 300 passengers daily.

Surrounding area
 National Route 45
 Aeon Mall Ishinomaki
 Senseki Hospital

Schools
 Miyagi Prefectural Ishinomakinishi High School
 Ishinomaki Municipal Aoba Junior High School
 Ishinomaki Municipal Hebita Junior High School

See also
 List of railway stations in Japan

References

External links

  
  

Stations of East Japan Railway Company
Railway stations in Miyagi Prefecture
Senseki Line
Railway stations in Japan opened in 2016
Ishinomaki